Zonguldak Kömürspor is a Turkish professional football club based in Zonguldak. The club is also known as Kara Elmas (Dark Diamond).

History

Previous names
 Demir Madencilik Dilaverspor (1986–2011)
 Zonguldak Kömürspor (2011–present)

Overview
It was promoted to First League after winning the White Group of Second League championship in 1973–74 season.  It became a nightmare team for the Big Three in the late 1970s and early 1980s. It was the most successful in 1979–80 season and became the 3rd. It pined away after 4th in 1981–82 season and relegated to Third League after two successive seasons between 1987–1989. It yoyoed between old Second and Third Leagues after 1989. It was one of the founder teams of the new Third League, which is the fourth tier of the Turkish League system in 2001. It promoted to Second League after finishing as champion at Third Group of Third League in 2001–2002 season. It missed out promotion to Second League Category A next season. It pined away again after 2002–2003 season and relegated to Third League after finishing 8th or last in Fourth Classifiment Group of Second League Category B in 2005–2006 season. It struggled to escaping from relegation to Amateur League because of financial straits until 2007–2008 season. It finally relegated to Zonguldak Super Amateur League after losing 3–2 away match against Beylerbeyi, who is Galatasaray's pilot team and promoted to Second League, at Round 29. It finished 13th or 4th from last in Fourth Group of Third League. Its relegation meant no representative of Zonguldak province at Turkish League since 2008. Zonguldakspor finished Zonguldak Super Amateur as runner-up in 2008–2009 season and as champion in 2009–10 one and finally qualified for Regional Amateur League. It finished 4th this group and was forced to play-out against Demir Madencilik Dilaverspor, play-off winner of Zonguldak Super Amateur. Club lost it with 4–2 defeat on April 24, 2011 and relegated to Zonguldak Super Amateur. Zonguldakspor changed Its name as Fenerspor and color as dark red-blue on May 10, 2011.

Also Demir Madencilik Dilaverspor, was founded in 1986, changed its name from red-white to red-navy and was renamed as Zonguldak Kömürspor on May 18, 2011. Fenerspor currently doesn't field team. Zonguldak Kömürspor finally promoted to Third League in 2013–14 season. Komürspor finished 1st Group of 3rd league as 3rd in 2014–15 season and qualified promotion play-offs. However it was eliminated by Istanbulspor in semifinal due to away goal rule. It finished 1st group of 3rd League as 4th and again qualified promotion play-offs. It eliminated Tire 1922 with 4-1 aggregate in semifinal. It faced with Kızılcabölükspor in final. It beat them as 2-1 and promoted to third level in 2015–16 season.

League participations (as Zonguldakspor)
 Turkish Super League: 1974–88
 TFF First League: 1966–74, 1988–89, 1992–99
 TFF Second League: 1989–92, 1999–2001, 2002–06
 TFF Third League: 2001–02, 2006–08
 Turkish Regional Amateur League: 2010–11
 Turkish Amateur Football Leagues 2008–10

League participations (as Demir Madencilik Dilaverspor and Zonguldak Kömürspor)

 TFF Second League: 2016–
 TFF Third League: 2014–16
 Turkish Regional Amateur League: 2011–14
 Turkish Amateur Football Leagues: 1986–2011

Current squad

References

External links
Zonguldak on TFF.org
Facebook

 
Football clubs in Turkey
Association football clubs established in 1986
Sport in Zonguldak
1986 establishments in Turkey
Süper Lig clubs